The 1897 Massachusetts gubernatorial election was held on November 2, 1897.

General election

Candidates
 John Bascom, former President of the University of Wisconsin (Prohibition)
 Thomas C. Brophy (Socialist Labor)
 William Everett, former U.S. Representative from Quincy (National Democratic)
 George Fred Williams, former U.S. Representative from Dedham (Democratic)
 Roger Wolcott, incumbent Governor (Republican)

Results

Lt. Governor

See also
 1897 Massachusetts legislature

Notes

References

Governor
1897
Massachusetts
November 1897 events